Remco Pardoel (born May 23, 1969) is a retired Dutch mixed martial artist. He competed in the heavyweight division. He has fought in promotions such as the UFC, Shooto and Pancrase. He was a junior national champion in Judo in 1988, and a competitive BJJ grappler. He made his MMA debut at UFC 2, eventually losing to Royce Gracie. Over the course of his career he fought Vernon White, Minoru Suzuki, and Marco Ruas.

Early career
Pardoel began his martial arts career at age 4 when he first began training in Judo. At age 7, he began training in Taekwondo and took up traditional Jiu-Jitsu at age 11. He won gold at the 1988 Junior National Judo Championships in the Netherlands, followed by a number of Ju Jitsu titles across Europe. He became Ju Jitsu world champion in 1993 when the sport's first World Championship was held in Denmark. There, he met Fabio Gurgel, Romero Cavalcanti, Sylvio Behring and other fighters, who taught him some of the sport's techniques. He would invite the Brazilian team to the Netherlands, and so Brazilian Jiu-Jitsu was introduced in Europe, in his hometown of Oss, starting in November 1993.

Ultimate Fighting Championship
In 1994, Pardoel was invited to Ultimate Fighting Championship at its event UFC 2 in United States. Cornered by UFC 1 finalist Gerard Gordeau, Remco was billed as a Jiu-Jitsu fighter, and was pitted in the first round of the tournament against Alberto Cerro León, a Spanish Pencak Silat practitioner. The bout was long and violent, as although Pardoel threw León to the ground early, the Spaniard resisted his armlock attempts and even tried an illegal fish hook in repeated occasions. At the end, Pardoel submitted him with a sode guruma jime. The Dutch fighter was later quoted as: "Alberto was the reason to enter the UFC for me… In Europe, the guys from Pencak Silat and Wing Chun are badmouthing all other styles by saying and writing that they are invincible, which [they're] not. So the best way to prove that they are wrong is to challenge them."

Pardoel advanced to the next round and fought Muay Thai fighter Orlando Wiet in a memorable match. The heavier Pardoel executed a hip throw and pinned Wiet on the mat with ura gatame. After some hesitation, the Jiu-Jitsu champion then proceeded to land seven brutal elbow strikes on Wiet's temple, resulting in a knockout. Wiet was actually rendered unconscious after the second blow, and Pardoel himself had to speak to the referee in order to get the match stopped. The Dutch contender went to the semi-finals to face UFC 1 winner Royce Gracie, another Brazilian Jiu-Jitsu exponent. Seconds into the match, Royce captured Pardoel's back while standing, tripped him down and performed a gi choke, making Remco tap out.

He returned to UFC in September 1995 at the event UFC 7. His first opponent would be Karateka Ryan Parker, whom he defeated in swift fashion by throwing him down, pinning him with kesa gatame and locking a mounted Ezekiel choke. The Dutchman advanced to meet Luta Livre legend Marco Ruas, also the eventual winner. Pardoel got a guillotine choke early, but Ruas escaped via foot stomps and they both met on the ground, where the Brazilian tried a straight-ankle lock to no avail. After some minutes of struggle, Ruas mounted Pardoel, and the latter opted to tap out. Pardoel would later claim that Ruas was using some sort of body oil or lubricant to hinder his hold. It would be Pardoel's last appearance in UFC.

Mixed martial arts record

|-
| Loss
| align=center| 9–6–1 (2)
| Tengiz Tedoradze
| TKO (submission to punches)
| EF 1: Genesis
| 
| align=center| 1
| align=center| 2:44
| London, England
| 
|-
| NC
| align=center| 9–5–1 (2)
| Roger Godinez
| No Contest
| GC 11: Gladiator Challenge 11
| 
| align=center| 1
| align=center| 0:17
| San Jacinto, California, United States
| 
|-
| Loss
| align=center| 9–5–1 (1)
| Mark Smith
| Decision
| CW 1: Cage Wars 1
| 
| align=center| 2
| align=center| 0:00
| Portsmouth, England
| 
|-
| Win
| align=center| 9–4–1 (1)
| Glen Brown
| Submission (scarf hold)
| UKMMAC 1: Sudden Impact
| 
| align=center| 2
| align=center| 0:00
| Kent, England
| 
|-
| Draw
| align=center| 8–4–1 (1)
| Herman van Tol
| Draw
| Rings Holland: No Guts, No Glory
| 
| align=center| 2
| align=center| 5:00
| Amsterdam, North Holland, Netherlands
| 
|-
| Win
| align=center| 8–4 (1)
| Marc Emmanuel
| Decision (unanimous)
| Rings Holland: Heroes Live Forever
| 
| align=center| 2
| align=center| 5:00
| Utrecht, Netherlands
| 
|-
| Loss
| align=center| 7–4 (1)
| Roman Savochka
| TKO (submission to strikes)
| IAFC: Pankration World Championship 2000 [Day 2]
| 
| align=center| 1
| align=center| 0:00
| Moscow, Russia
| 
|-
| Win
| align=center| 7–3 (1)
| John Dixson
| Submission (headlock)
| AAC 2: Amsterdam Absolute Championship 2
| 
| align=center| 1
| align=center| 8:15
| Amsterdam, North Holland, Netherlands
| 
|-
| Win
| align=center| 6–3 (1)
| Michailis Deligiannakis
| Submission (keylock)
| WVC 8: World Vale Tudo Championship 8
| 
| align=center| 1
| align=center| 2:20
| Aruba
| 
|-
| Win
| align=center| 5–3 (1)
| John Dixson
| Submission (choke)
| AAC 1: Amsterdam Absolute Championship 1
| 
| align=center| 1
| align=center| 4:16
| Amsterdam, North Holland, Netherlands
| 
|-
| Loss
| align=center| 4–3 (1)
| Marco Ruas
| Submission (position)
| rowspan=2|UFC 7: The Brawl in Buffalo
| rowspan=2|
| align=center| 1
| align=center| 12:27
| rowspan=2|Buffalo, New York, United States
| 
|-
| Win
| align=center| 4–2 (1)
| Ryan Parker
| Submission (lapel choke)
| align=center| 1
| align=center| 3:05
| 
|-
| NC
| align=center| 3–2 (1)
| Carl Franks
| No Contest
| Shooto: Complete Vale Tudo Access
| 
| align=center| 1
| align=center| 8:00
| Omiya, Saitama, Japan
| 
|-
| Loss
| align=center| 3–2
| Minoru Suzuki
| KO (punch)
| Pancrase: Road To The Championship 3
| 
| align=center| 1
| align=center| 7:16
| Tokyo, Japan
| 
|-
| Win
| align=center| 3–1
| Vernon White
| TKO (lost points)
| Pancrase: Road To The Championship 2
| 
| align=center| 1
| align=center| 14:24
| Amagasaki, Hyogo, Japan
| 
|-
| Loss
| align=center| 2–1
| Royce Gracie
| Submission (lapel choke)
| rowspan=3|UFC 2: No Way Out
| rowspan=3|
| align=center| 1
| align=center| 1:31
| rowspan=3|Denver, Colorado, United States
| 
|-
| Win
| align=center| 2–0
| Orlando Wiet
| KO (elbows)
| align=center| 1
| align=center| 1:29
| 
|-
| Win
| align=center| 1–0
| Alberto Cerra Leon
| Submission (forearm choke)
| align=center| 1
| align=center| 9:51
|

Submission grappling record
KO PUNCHES
|- style="text-align:center; background:#f0f0f0;"
| style="border-style:none none solid solid; "|Result
| style="border-style:none none solid solid; "|Opponent
| style="border-style:none none solid solid; "|Method
| style="border-style:none none solid solid; "|Event
| style="border-style:none none solid solid; "|Date
| style="border-style:none none solid solid; "|Round
| style="border-style:none none solid solid; "|Time
| style="border-style:none none solid solid; "|Notes
|-
|Loss|| Ricardo Liborio || Submission (armbar) || World Jiu-jitsu Championship|| 1996||  || ||
|-

See also
List of male mixed martial artists

References

External links
 
 
 Remco Pardoel at mixedmartialarts.com
 Remco Pardoel at fightmatrix.com

Dutch male mixed martial artists
Heavyweight mixed martial artists
Mixed martial artists utilizing taekwondo
Mixed martial artists utilizing judo
Mixed martial artists utilizing Brazilian jiu-jitsu
Living people
1969 births
Dutch male taekwondo practitioners
Dutch male judoka
Dutch practitioners of Brazilian jiu-jitsu
People awarded a black belt in Brazilian jiu-jitsu
Sportspeople from Oss
Sportspeople from North Brabant
Ultimate Fighting Championship male fighters
20th-century Dutch people
21st-century Dutch people